Ballymoney railway station serves the town of Ballymoney in County Antrim, Northern Ireland.

History
Ballymoney station was opened by the Ballymena, Ballymoney, Coleraine and Portrush Junction Railway on 4 December 1855.

The station was rebuilt between 1901 and 1902 to designs by Berkeley Deane Wise in a Cottage style. The cast ironwork forming the station canopy was provided by MacFarlane's Saracen Foundry of Glasgow, and the cast iron footbridge was provided by the Sun Foundry of George Smith and Company in Glasgow.

Goods traffic was ceased on Monday 4 January 1965.

The station was also the southern terminus of the narrow gauge Ballycastle Railway, which closed in 1950.

Service
The last train of the day terminates at 

On Sundays an hourly service operates to Great Victoria street. In the other direction all services are alternate every hour between Londonderry and Portrush except for the last outbound train of the evening, which terminates at Coleraine.

References 

Railway stations in County Antrim
Railway stations opened in 1855
Railway stations served by NI Railways
1855 establishments in Ireland
railway station
Railway stations in Northern Ireland opened in the 19th century